Fox Cave is located on East Highway 70 between Roswell and Alamogordo, near Ruidoso, New Mexico. It was once used as a hideout by William H. Bonney, better known as Billy the Kid and also known as Henry Antrim, a 19th-century American gunman who participated in the Lincoln County War and became a frontier outlaw in the American Old West.

Originally known as "Ice Cave" in the late 1800s and early 1900s, the rocks of Fox Cave are primarily micritic limestone. The cave was formed over thousands of years by erosion of the rock caused by the Ruidoso River.

References

Further reading 
 

Caves of New Mexico
Landforms of Lincoln County, New Mexico